Soo Line may refer to:

 Minneapolis, St. Paul and Sault Ste. Marie Railroad, a major railroad west of Minneapolis–Saint Paul; merged into the Soo Line Railroad in 1961
 Minneapolis, St. Paul and Sault Ste. Marie Depot (disambiguation), various train stations
 Soo Line Building, a 19-story residential highrise in Minneapolis, Minnesota
 Soo Line Corporation, a corporation that manages the Soo Line Railroad
 Soo Line Depot (disambiguation), various train stations
 Soo Line locomotives, a list page
 Soo Line Railroad, a Canadian Pacific Railway subsidiary